John O'Brien (1831–1891) was a Canadian marine artist. He excelled at ship portraits combined with dramatic storm scenes.

Career
John Daniel O’Connell O'Brien (named for the Irish “Liberator,” Daniel O’Connell) is believed to have been born in Saint John, New Brunswick but his parents moved to Halifax when he was a baby. He emerged as a self-taught artist in Halifax, Nova Scotia in 1850 and advertised himself as a professional in 1853. In 1857, he studied in England with the English landscape artist John W. Carmichael and returned to Halifax the following year, having learned to colour photographs as well as to paint stormy skies. His career flourished as Nova Scotia's shipping industry grew and his many notable paintings include a portrait of the famous clipper Stag and dramatic storm portraits of the warship HMS Galatea. At the height of his career in 1859, he suffered a partial loss of vision. His career underwent a decline in the 1870s, when he produced very few works, but revived in the 1880s when he returned to easel painting, producing almost half of his known 53 works in the studio.

Selected collections
Art Gallery of Nova Scotia;
National Gallery of Canada;
Sobey art collection.

References

Further reading
John O'Brien (1831-1891), by Patrick Condon Laurette, Art Gallery of Nova Scotia, (1984)
"Ship Portraits Sail into View", The Beaver, March 21–27, 2008

External links
 
Dan Conlin “Ominous Sky: The Stormy Career and Work of Marine Artist John O’Brien: 1831-1891”, Nashwaak Review, Vol. 22-23 (2010), 493-506.
"O'Brien, John Daniel O'Connell" entry in Dictionary of Canadian Biography
O'Brien at the Art Gallery of Nova Scotia
O'Brien at the National Gallery of Canada

1831 births
1891 deaths
19th-century Canadian painters
Canadian male painters
Canadian marine artists
Irish emigrants to pre-Confederation New Brunswick
19th-century Canadian male artists